Vilafamés is a municipality located in the province of Castellón, Valencian Community, Spain.

Notable people 
 Marc Trilles, footballer

References

Municipalities in the Province of Castellón
Plana Alta